CET or cet may refer to:

Places
 Cet, Albania
 Cet, standard astronomical abbreviation for the constellation Cetus
 Colchester Town railway station (National Rail code CET), in Colchester, England

Arts, entertainment, and media
 Comcast Entertainment Television, a Denver, Colorado TV station
 Community Educational Television, a station ownership arm of the Trinity Broadcasting Network
 Coventry Evening Telegraph, a newspaper in Coventry, England
 WCET-TV, a PBS station serving Cincinnati, Ohio

Education

Schools
 College of Engineering, Trivandrum, in Kerala, India
 College of Engineering and Technology, in Bhubaneswar, Orissa, India

Tests
 College English Test, a national English examination in People's Republic of China
 Common Entrance Test, for prospective students seeking entry into institutes of higher education in India

Technology
 Carrier Ethernet Transport, an ethernet extension
 Center for Environmental Technology, a radio receiver designer
 Certified Engineering Technologist, a Canadian qualification
 Control-flow enforcement technology, a security technology by Intel
 Critical exposure temperature, a factor in determining the minimum design metal temperature
 FV180 Combat Engineer Tractor

Other uses
 Caesars Entertainment Corporation, often abbreviated as "CET"
 Canadian Equestrian Team
 Carbon emissions trading
 Central England temperature, a set of monthly records dating back to the seventeenth century
 Central European Time, UTC+1:00
 Colombo Electric Tramways
A common external tariff applied by a customs union
 Common Eligibility Test, an examination for government recruitment in India